Paul Lehrieder (born 20 November 1959) is a German lawyer and politician of the Christian Social Union (CSU) who has been serving as a member of the Bundestag from the state of Bavaria since 2005. He represents Würzburg.

Political career 
Lehrieder became member of the bundestag after the 2005 German federal election. He is a member of the Committee on Tourism and the Committee on Legal Affairs and Consumer Protection.

In addition to his committee assignments, Lehrieder is part of the German Parliamentary Friendship Group for Relations with the States of South Asia.

In the negotiations to form a Grand Coalition of the Christian Democrats (CDU together with the Bavarian CSU) and the Social Democrats (SPD) following the 2013 federal elections, Lehrieder was part of the CDU/CSU delegation in the working group on labor policy, led by Ursula von der Leyen and Andrea Nahles. In similar negotiations following the 2017 federal elections, he was part of the working group on families, women, seniors and youth, led by Annette Widmann-Mauz, Angelika Niebler and Katarina Barley.

Political positions
In June 2017, Lehrieder voted against Germany's introduction of same-sex marriage.

References

External links 

  
 Bundestag biography 

1959 births
Living people
Members of the Bundestag for Bavaria
Members of the Bundestag 2021–2025
Members of the Bundestag 2017–2021
Members of the Bundestag 2013–2017
Members of the Bundestag 2009–2013
Members of the Bundestag 2005–2009
People from Ochsenfurt
Members of the Bundestag for the Christian Social Union in Bavaria